South Mimms services is a motorway service area accessible from Junction 23 of the M25 motorway which is also Junction 1 of the A1(M), in England near South Mimms, Hertfordshire. Constructed in 1986 as the first service area on the M25, it is operated by Welcome Break. It is built on the site of Bignell's Corner, named after a garden centre, Bignell and Cutbush, which was close to the junction of the old A6, and A1. At the junction there was also a pub, the Middlesex Arms, and an Esso Motor hotel, near which developed a notorious truck stop and the Beacon Cafe.

History
When constructed in 1986, it was the first service area directly accessible from the M25. South Mimms services is more commonly known as The Mecca of service stations, with all British service stations pointing in its direction. 

The building was destroyed in August 1998 following a fire started in a deep fryer with no fire suppression system; an incident which has been subsequently studied.

An unusual heist of 2,900 dresses all of the same design occurred in the lorry park at the service area on the morning of 13 August 2013. The loot was valued at £17,000.

The 2019 Motorway Services User Survey found that South Mimms was in the top five motorway services in the UK for customer satisfaction.

References

M25 motorway service stations
Welcome Break motorway service stations
A1(M) motorway service stations
Former truck stops